Coordination failure may refer to:
 Coordination failure (political science)
 Coordination failure (economics)